Bendigo is the suburb of the City of Greater Bendigo, Victoria, Australia. It is the central suburb of the city.

References 

Bendigo
Suburbs of Bendigo